D. T. Cromer (born March 19, 1971) is an American former professional baseball player. He graduated from Lexington High School in Lexington, South Carolina and played baseball in college at the University of South Carolina. He went on to play baseball in MLB (drafted by the Oakland Athletics in the 11th round of the 1992 Major League Baseball draft), as well as in Japan. He played in a total of 85 big league games, all with the Cincinnati Reds. He declined assignment to Triple-A in 2001 and play for the Nippon-Ham Fighters of the Nippon Professional Baseball (NPB).
His older brother, Tripp was also a Major League Baseball player.

References

External links

1971 births
Living people
American expatriate baseball players in Canada
American expatriate baseball players in Japan
Baseball players from South Carolina
Cincinnati Reds players
Edmonton Trappers players
Huntsville Stars players
Indianapolis Indians players
Louisville RiverBats players
Madison Muskies players
Major League Baseball first basemen
Nippon Ham Fighters players
Nippon Professional Baseball first basemen
Nippon Professional Baseball outfielders
People from Lake City, South Carolina
South Carolina Gamecocks baseball players
Southern Oregon A's players
West Michigan Whitecaps players